Furkan Ulaş Memiş (born April 22, 1991) is a Turkish amateur boxer competing in the bantamweight division.

Memiş was born in Trabzon.  At , he weighs .

He competed at the 2008 Olympics in flyweight but was defeated in his first bout by Indian Jitender Kumar. At the 2011 European Amateur Championships held in Ankara, Turkey, he won the bronze medal.

External links

Results

1991 births
Flyweight boxers
Living people
Boxers at the 2008 Summer Olympics
Olympic boxers of Turkey
Sportspeople from Trabzon
Bantamweight boxers
Turkish male boxers
21st-century Turkish people